Henri Daniel-Rops (Épinal, 19 January 1901 – Tresserve, 27 July 1965) was a French Roman Catholic writer and historian whose real name was Henri Petiot.

Biography
Daniel-Rops was the son of a military officer. He was a student at the Faculties of Law and Literature in Grenoble, receiving his Agrégation in History in 1922 at the age of 21, the youngest in France. He was a professor of history in Chambéry, then in Amiens and finally in Paris. In the late 1920s he began his literary career with an essay, Notre inquiétude (Our Anxiety, 1926), a novel, L'âme obscure (The Dark Soul, 1929), and several articles in journals such as Correspondent, Notre Temps and La Revue des vivants.

Daniel-Rops, who had been brought up a Roman Catholic, had by the 1920s become an agnostic. In Notre inquiétude his theme was humanity's loss of meaning and direction in an increasingly industrialized and mechanized world. When he considered the misery and social injustice around him, and the apparent indifference of Christians to those they called their brothers, he questioned whether Christianity was any longer a living force in the world.

The alternatives, however, did not seem any better. Marxism, for instance, claimed to concern itself with people's material well-being, but quite ignored their non-material needs, which for Daniel-Rops was unacceptable. In the 1930s he returned to the Catholic Church, having come to feel that, in spite of the shortcomings of Christians, it was only through Christianity that the technological age could be reconciled with humanity's inner needs.

Literary career
Starting in 1931 he wrote mostly about Catholicism, advised by Gabriel Marcel with whom he shared membership of the Ordre Nouveau. He helped disseminate its ideas in books in which it is often difficult to distinguish his personal reflections from the doctrines of the movement he had attached himself to, and which make him a leading representative of the intellectual ferment among non-conformists in the 1930s: Le Monde sans âme (The World without a Soul), Les annés tournantes, Eléments de notre destin.

After 1935, his ties with Ordre Nouveau loosened somewhat. He collaborated with the Catholic weeklies Sept and Temps présent. By 1940 he had published several novels, biographies and essays. For Plon he directed the collection Présences, in which he published the book La France et son armée (France and Its Army) by General de Gaulle, who became his friend.

From 1941 to 1944, he wrote Le peuple de la Bible (The People of the Bible) and Jésus et son temps (Jesus and His Times), the first of a series of works of religious history that would culminate in the monumental Histoire de l'Eglise du Christ (History of the Church of Christ) (1948–1965).

After the liberation of France in 1944, he abandoned teaching to devote himself to his work as a Christian historian and writer, directing the magazine Ecclésia and editing Je sais, je crois (I know, I believe), published in English as The Twentieth Century Encyclopedia of Catholicism. He was undoubtedly the French writer most widely read by post-war Catholics.

At the same time, with some former colleagues from Ordre Nouveau, he worked with various European federalist movements. He joined The Federation, and the French Federalist Movement.

From 1957 to 1963 he was one of the fifty governors of the European Foundation of Culture founded by Denis de Rougemont. In 1955, he was elected to the Académie française.

Selected works
Daniel Rops has written novels and works of religious history:

Nôtre Inquiétude (1926)
L'âme obscure (1929). Novel
Mort, où est ta victoire ? (Death, Where Is Thy Victory?) (1934). Novel
Histoire sainte de mes filleuls (1936)L'épée de feu (1939). NovelLe peuple de la Bible (1943)Jésus en son temps (Jesus and His Times) (1945)L'Evangile de mes filleuls (1947) La nuit du cœur flambant (1947)Histoire sainte (1954)Qu'est-ce que la Bible ? (What Is the Bible?) (1955)Cathedral and Crusade: Studies of the Medieval Church 1050-1350 (1957)La vie quotidienne en Palestine au temps de Jésus (Daily Life in Palestine at the Time of Jesus) (1961)L'Eglise de la Renaissance et de la Réforme (date unknown)
 Histoire de l’Église du Christ. VIII, L’Église des révolutions 3 : Ces Chrétiens nos frères'' (1965)

References

External links
 
 Daniel-Rops autobio
 News and biographical works on the site of the Académie française 
 Works by Daniel-Rops on 2nd-hand booksite Antiqbook

1901 births
1965 deaths
People from Épinal
Converts to Roman Catholicism from atheism or agnosticism
French Roman Catholics
Members of the Académie Française
Knights Commander of the Order of St Gregory the Great
Roman Catholic writers
20th-century French novelists
20th-century French historians
Historians of the Catholic Church
French male novelists
20th-century French male writers
Commandeurs of the Légion d'honneur
Non-conformists of the 1930s